Meshaal Al-Suwaidi (Arabic:مشعل السويدي) (born 18 December 1996) is a Qatari footballer who plays as a midfielder for Al Khor.

Career
Al-Suwaidi started his career at Al-Khor and is a product of the Al-Khor's youth system. On 11 October 2018, Al-Suwaidi made his professional debut for Al-Khor against Al-Duhail in the Pro League, replacing Ahmed Al-Asker.

External links

References

Living people
1996 births
Qatari footballers
Al-Khor SC players
Qatar Stars League players
Association football midfielders
Place of birth missing (living people)